The 2004–05 Mongolia Hockey League season was the 14th season of the Mongolia Hockey League. Baganuur won the championship by defeating Otgon Od Ulaanbaatar in the playoff final.

Regular season

First round

Second round

Playoffs

Semifinals
Baganuur - EU Ulaanbaatar 7-4, 4-5, 8-4
Otgon Od Ulaanbaatar - Shariin Gol 5-6, 6-5, 6-3

3rd place
Shariin Gol - EU Ulaanbaatar 5-4

Final
Baganuur - Otgon Od Ulaanbaatar 4-3

External links
Season on hockeyarchives.info

Mongolia
Mongolia Hockey League seasons
Mon